Win Lyovarin (RTGS: Win Liaowarin, birth name: Somchai Lyowarin, Thai: สมชัย เลี้ยววาริณ, born 23 March 1956) is a Thai writer. He is a two-time winner of the S.E.A. Write Award.

His novels and short stories have been hailed in Thailand for being provocative and encouraging young readers to develop critical thinking skills.

Personal life
Win was born in Hat Yai District, Songkhla Province, Thailand. His father was a Chinese immigrant who settled in Hat Yai and earned his living as a shopkeeper.  Win has a son named Trin who is currently a doctor in Singapore.

Awards

S.E.A. Write Award
S.E.A. Write Award in 1997, for the novel Pracha Thippatai Bon Sen Khanan (translated in 2003 as Democracy, Shaken and Stirred)
S.E.A. Write Award in 1999, for the short story collection Sing Mi Chiwit Thi Riak Wa Khon ("the creatures called humans")

National Book Improvement Committee
Outstanding Book Award in 1995, for Aphet Kamsuan
Outstanding Book Award in 1995, for Pracha Thippatai Bon Sen Khanan
Honorable Mention in 1995, for Samut Pok Dam Kap Baimai Si Daeng
Outstanding Book Award in 2003, for Pik Daeng

Thailand Research Fund
One of 88 Good Science Books in 2001, for Duean Chuang Duang Den Fa Da Dao
One of 100 Good Books That Children and Young Adults Should Read, for Sing Mi Chiwit Thi Riak Wa Khon

Silpathorn Award
Win received the Silpathorn Award for Literature in 2006, awarded annually by the Thailand Ministry of Culture Office of Contemporary Art and Culture to living contemporary artists in the fields of literature, music, filmmaking, visual arts, and performing arts.

Works

Novels
 Pracha Thippatai Bon Sen Khanaan (ประชาธิปไตยบนเส้นขนาน; 1994) 
Published in English in 2003 as Democracy, Shaken and Stirred . A review by Ron Morris states that the Thai title of the book translates as "Democracy Along Parallel Lines". Winbookclub product details
 Pik Daeng (ปีกแดง; novel; 2002) 
 Phu Chai Khon Thi Tam Rak Thoe Thuk Chat Phim Khrang Thi Paet Sip Ha (ผู้ชายคนที่ตามรักเธอทุกชาติ พิมพ์ครั้งที่ 85; 2006) 
 Lok Bai Thi Song Khong Mo (โลกใบที่สองของโม; 2006) 
 Fon Tok Khuen Fa (ฝนตกขึ้นฟ้า; 2007) 
 Khattakam Chak Rasi (ฆาตกรรมจักรราศี; 2008; book three in the Siao Nak Suep เสี่ยวนักสืบ series)
 Bunga Pari (บุหงาปารี; 2008; adapted from the screenplay Queens of Langasuka)

Collected short stories and articles
 Samut Pok Dam Kap Baimai Si Daeng (สมุดปกดำกับใบไม้สีแดง; 1994) 
 Aphet Kamsuan (อาเพศกำสรวล; 1994) 
 Duean Chuang Duang Den Fa Da Dao (เดือนช่วงดวงเด่นฟ้าดาดาว; 1995) 
 Sing Mi Chiwit Thi Riak Wa Khon (สิ่งมีชีวิตที่เรียกว่าคน; 1999) 
 Nueng Wan Diao Kan (หนึ่งวันเดียวกัน; 2001) 
Published in English in 2005 as A Day in the Life 
 Lang An Buri (หลังอานบุรี; 2001) 
 Pan Nam Pen Tua (ปั้นน้ำเป็นตัว; 2003) 
 Am ( ำ; 2003) 
 Wan Raek Khong Wan Thi Luea (วันแรกของวันที่เหลือ; 2004) 
 Khatakam Klang Thale (ฆาตกรรมกลางทะเล; 2004; book one in the Siao Nak Suep เสี่ยวนักสืบ series); 
 Pla Thi Wai Nai Sanam Futbon (ปลาที่ว่ายในสนามฟุตบอล; 2005) 
 Niyai Khang Cho (นิยายข้างจอ; 2005) 
 Charun Charat Ratsami Phrao Phrang Phroi (จรูญจรัสรัศมีพราว พร่างพร้อย; 2005) 
 Roi Thao Lek Lek Khong Rao Eng (รอยเท้าเล็กๆของเราเอง; 2005) 
 Khadi Phii Nang Takhian (คดีผีนางตะเคียน 2006; book two in the Siao Nak Suep เสี่ยวนักสืบ series) 
 Lok Dan Thi Han Lang Hai Duang Athit (โลกด้านที่หันหลังให้ดวงอาทิตย์; 2006) 
 Khwam Fan Ngo Ngo (ความฝันโง่ ๆ; 2006) 
 Ya Kae Samong Phuk Tra Khwai Bin (ยาแก้สมองผูก ตราควายบิน; 2007) 
 Nam Khaeng Unit Tra Khwai Bin (น้ำแข็งยูนิต ตราควายบิน; 2007) 
 Bueang Bon Yang Mi Saeng Dao (เบื้องบนยังมีแสงดาว; 2007) 
 Bang Kaphong (บางกะโพ้ง; 2007) 
 Athit Khuen Thang Thit Tawan Tok (อาทิตย์ขึ้นทางทิศตะวันตก; 2008)
 Doen Pai Hai Sut Fan (เดินไปให้สุดฝัน; 2008)

With Prabda Yoon
 Khwam Na Cha Pen Bon Sen Khanan (ความน่าจะเป็นบนเส้นขนาน; 2002) 
 Khwam Na Cha Pen Bon Sen Khanan 2 (ความน่าจะเป็นบนเส้นขนาน 2; 2004) 
 Khwam Na Cha Pen Bon Sen Khanan 3 (ความน่าจะเป็นบนเส้นขนาน 3; 2005) 
 Khwam Na Cha Pen Bon Sen Khanan 4 (ความน่าจะเป็นบนเส้นขนาน 4; 2006) 
 Khwam Na Cha Pen Bon Sen Khanan 5 (ความน่าจะเป็นบนเส้นขนาน 5; 2007)

Screenplays
 Queens of Langkasuka (2008, with Nonzee Nimibutr)

Notes

External links
 WinBookClub.com, Win Lyovarin's website
 Win Lyovarin at (ThaiWriter.net )

Win Lyovarin
Win Lyovarin
1956 births
Living people
Win Lyovarin
S.E.A. Write Award winners
Win Lyovarin
Win Lyovarin
Win Lyovarin
Win Lyovarin
Win Lyovarin
20th-century novelists
21st-century novelists
20th-century short story writers
21st-century short story writers
Win Lyovarin
Win Lyovarin